George Cave, 1st Viscount Cave,  (23 February 1856 – 29 March 1928) was a British lawyer and Conservative politician. He was Home Secretary under David Lloyd George from 1916 to 1919 and served as Lord Chancellor from 1922 to 1924 and again from 1924 to 1928.

Background and education

Cave was born in London, the son of Thomas Cave, Member of Parliament for Barnstaple, and his wife Elizabeth, daughter of Jasper Shallcrass. He was educated at the Merchant Taylors' School, London and St John's College, Oxford. After being called to the bar in 1880, he practised as a barrister for a number of years, being made King's Counsel and recorder of Guildford in 1904.

Political career

In 1906 he was elected Conservative Member of Parliament for the Kingston Division of Surrey, was appointed Vice-Lieutenant of Surrey in 1907, and a member of the Royal Commission on Land Purchase in 1908. Having served as standing Counsel to the University of Oxford for two years as well as Attorney General to the Prince of Wales, in 1915 Cave was appointed Solicitor General and knighted. The following year, he was made Home Secretary in Lloyd George's coalition government, a post he held for three years. As Home Secretary, he introduced the Representation of the People Act 1918 and he was very prominent in the debates in the House of Commons on the police strike of August 1918.

In 1918, Sir George Cave was ennobled as Viscount Cave, of Richmond in the County of Surrey. The following year, he became a Lord of Appeal, and chaired a number of commissions, including the Southern Rhodesian commission and the Munitions Enquiry Tribunal. In 1922, he became Lord Chancellor in Bonar Law's government, and again served in this capacity in Baldwin's first administration. He chaired the post war report that led to cuts to the minimum wages and regulation of collective bargaining, recommended by the Cave Committee in 1922.

Having been appointed Knight Grand Cross of the Order of St Michael and St George (GCMG) in 1921, he was also elected Chancellor of the University of Oxford in 1925, defeating former Liberal Prime Minister H. H. Asquith. Asquith was deeply upset by the defeat, partly because he felt that Cave, an old friend, should not have stood against him.

Roy Jenkins, an admirer of Asquith, described him as the least distinguished Lord Chancellor in the first three decades of the twentieth century.

Family
Lord Cave married Annie Estella Sarah Penfold Mathews, daughter of Captain William Withey Mathews and Jane Wallas (née Penfold), and sister of Sir Lloyd Mathews, in 1885. They had met by 1880, and he proposed to her in 1883. Lord and Lady Cave had three sons and one daughter, although each of them died on the day they were born, or soon afterwards.  Their names were Ralph Wallas (1885), Lloyd George (1893), Honor Elizabeth (1895), and Mathew George (1899). They are all buried at St. Mary's in Richmond.  Cave died in March 1928, aged 72, at St Ann's, Burnham, Somerset, and was buried at Berrow in the same county - his wife's brother-in-law, W. K. Laurence, had been buried there only a week or so earlier, after dying tragically after a fall at Clevedon. 

On the day of his death his resignation as Lord Chancellor had been accepted and it had been announced that he would be created an earl, and so his widow, Estella, was created Countess Cave of Richmond, with remainder to heirs male of her body. 

Having no children who lived to adulthood, the viscountcy became extinct on Lord Cave's death, as did the earldom when his widow died in 1938.

References

Further reading

External links
 

 Europeana Collections 1914-1918 makes 425,000 First World War items from European libraries available online, including relevant volumes of The Cave Papers

1856 births
1928 deaths
Lord chancellors of Great Britain
Solicitors General for England and Wales
British Secretaries of State
Conservative Party (UK) MPs for English constituencies
Members of the Privy Council of the United Kingdom
English barristers
English King's Counsel
Alumni of St John's College, Oxford
Viscounts in the Peerage of the United Kingdom
Knights Grand Cross of the Order of St Michael and St George
Knights Bachelor
UK MPs 1906–1910
UK MPs 1910
UK MPs 1910–1918
UK MPs who were granted peerages
Members of the Judicial Committee of the Privy Council
Law lords
Viscounts created by George V